In Sami shamanism, Horagalles, also written Hora Galles and Thora Galles and often equated with Tiermes or Aijeke (i.e. "grandfather or great grandfather"), is the thunder god. He is depicted as a wooden figure with a nail in the head and with a hammer, or  occasionally on shaman drums, two hammers.

Characteristics and functions
Idols of Horagalles are made of wood and have a nail or spike and a piece of flint in the head. He has a hammer called Wetschera, Aijeke Wetschera, or Ajeke veċċera, "grandfather's hammer."

Horagalles is the god of the sky, thunder and lightning, the rainbow, weather, oceans, and lakes and rules over human life, health and wellbeing. He punishes "hurtful demons" or "evil spirits" (i.e., trolls) who frequent the rocks and mountains; he destroys them with his lightning, shoots them with his bow, or dashes their brains out with his hammer. The rainbow is his bow, "Aijeke dauge".

Horagalles depicted on Sami shaman drums

 
On Sami shaman drums Horagalles is occasionally depicted with a sledgehammer in one hand and a cross-hammer in the other, or symbolized by two crossed hammers. He made thunder and lightning with one hammer and withdrew them with the other to prevent damage.

Name and relationship to other gods
The name Horagalles does not occur in older dictionaries of Sami languages, for instance in the mid-19th century. He is often equated with Tiermes; in 1673 Johannes Scheffer, who did not use the name Horagalles, wrote that when Aijeke thundered, he was called Tiermes. There is considerable regional variation in the names; Horagalles (with its various spellings, including Thoragalles) is characteristically southern Sami, and the rainbow is referred to by a variety of names referring to thunder.

Early scholars noted the similarities between Horagalles and the Norse thunder-god Thor and that some Sami called him Thoron or simply Thor, and were unsure which had influenced which. But the name Horagalles is now interpreted as a loanword from the Old Norse Þórr Karl, "the Old Man Thor," "Thor, the Elder," or "Thor fellow," "Thor Karl" (possibly from Norwegian Torrekall), or Swedish Torsmannen, "the thunder man."

Horagalles' consort is called Ravdna, and the red berries of the rowan tree are sacred to her. The name Ravdna resembles North Germanic names for the tree, such as Old Norse reynir, and according to the Prose Edda book Skáldskaparmál, the rowan is called "the salvation of Thor" because Thor once saved himself by clinging to it. It has therefore been theorized that the Norse goddess Sif, Thor's wife, was once conceived of in the form of a rowan to which Thor clung.

Tiermes
Tiermes is a Sami god of thunder and rain, also called Aijeke or Ajeke and often identified with Horagalles.

Tiermes is god of the sky and thunder and lightning, the rainbow, weather, oceans, and lakes and rules over human life, health, and well-being. He protects people and their animals from "hurtful demons" and "evil spirits" (i.e., trolls). According to the mid-18th century Cérémonies et coutumes religieuses de tous les peuples du monde, "Thiermes or Thoron" is the first in a trinity, of whom the other members are Storjunkare and Baivre or Jumala. He is also called Aijeke, "grandfather" or "great-grandfather"; in 1673 Johannes Scheffer wrote that when Aijeke thundered, he was called Tiermes.

The names of the god vary considerably between regions, with Tiermes and variants being commonly used among northern Sami and Horagalles and variants among southern Sami, The word "dierpmis" could be a loanword from a pre-finno-ugric substrate language.

Pajonn
Pajonn is a Sami god of thunder. Other name and spelling variants include Bajann, Pajǟn and Pajanolmai, found in Finnish as Pajainen, all derived from the word pad'd'i, meaning "above". According to Zacharias Plantin, Pajonn is an alias of Doragass, which in turn is a distorted version of Horagalles.

See also
Buga

References

Further reading
 Axel Olrik. "Nordisk og lappisk gudsdyrkelse." Danske Studier 1905, pp. 39–63. 
 Axel Olrik. "Tordenguden og hans dreng i lappernes myteverden." Danske Studier 1906, pp. 65–69. 

Sámi gods
Thunder gods
Sky and weather gods